Landscape with the Fall of Icarus may refer to:
 Landscape with the Fall of Icarus, a painting attributed to Pieter Bruegel
 Landscape with the Fall of Icarus (poem), a poem by William Carlos Williams written as a response to the Bruegel painting

See also
 The Fall of Icarus (disambiguation)